Hiram A. Wright (1823 – May 27, 1855) was an American educator and politician from Wisconsin.

Born in St. Lawrence County, New York, Wright moved to Prairie du Chien, Wisconsin in 1846. Wright started the newspaper the Prairie du Chien Patriot in 1848 and he edited The Courier. He also studied law and was admitted to the bar in 1850. Wright was a county judge. He served in the Wisconsin State Assembly in 1853 and in the Wisconsin State Senate in 1851 and 1852. He was elected Superintendent of Public Instruction of Wisconsin. Wright died of chronic bronchitis at his home in Prairie du Chien while in office on May 27, 1855.

Notes

People from St. Lawrence County, New York
People from Prairie du Chien, Wisconsin
Educators from Wisconsin
Wisconsin state court judges
Members of the Wisconsin State Assembly
Wisconsin state senators
1823 births
1855 deaths
Superintendents of Public Instruction of Wisconsin
Educators from New York (state)
19th-century American politicians
19th-century American judges
19th-century American educators